Muzz may refer to:

Muzz (dating app) - a Muslim Marriage app
Muzz (musician), British electronic music artist
Muzz (band), an American rock supergroup
Muzz Buzz, Australian coffee chain
Murray "Muzz" MacPherson (born 1938), English ice hockey player
Muzz MacPherson Award
Muzz Murray (1891–1961), American ice hockey player
Muzz Patrick (1915–1998), Canadian ice hockey player
Muzz Skillings, American bassist for Living Colour